Briton Nikora (born 7 December 1997) is a New Zealand professional rugby league footballer who plays as a  forward for the Cronulla-Sutherland Sharks in the NRL, and New Zealand and the New Zealand Māori at international level.

Background
Nikora was born in Mount Maunganui, Tauranga, New Zealand.

Playing career

2018
Nikora played his junior football at Keebra Park on the Gold Coast, before being signed by the Cronulla-Sutherland Sharks. Nikora played in Cronulla's Holden cup teams in 2016 & the 2017 Junior Kiwis, in 2018 he was named in Cronulla's first grade squad and played Canterbury Cup NSW for Cronulla's feeder club Newtown.

2019
On 15 March 2019 Nikora made his NRL debut for Cronulla-Sutherland against the Newcastle Knights at Hunter stadium in a 14-8 loss.  Nikora made 24 appearances for Cronulla in the 2019 NRL season as the club finished 7th on the table and qualified for the finals.  Nikora played in the club's elimination final defeat against Manly at Brookvale Oval.

2020
In round 20 of the 2020 NRL season, Nikora scored two tries in a 38-28 loss to Canberra at Kogarah Oval.  The result saw Cronulla finish 8th on the table and qualify for the finals.

2021
Nikora played 22 games for Cronulla in the 2021 NRL season which saw the club narrowly miss the finals by finishing 9th on the table.

2022
In round 25 of the 2022 NRL season, Nikora scored a hat-trick in Cronulla's 38-16 victory over Newcastle.
Nikora played 24 games for Cronulla throughout the season as the club finished second on the table.  Nikora played in both finals games as Cronulla were eliminated in straight sets.

Statistics

NRL
 Statistics are correct as of the end of the 2022 season

All Star

International

References

External links

Cronulla Sharks profile

1997 births
Living people
Cronulla-Sutherland Sharks players
Junior Kiwis players
New Zealand Māori rugby league players
New Zealand national rugby league team players
New Zealand rugby league players
Newtown Jets NSW Cup players
People educated at Keebra Park State High School
Rugby league players from Tauranga
Rugby league second-rows